The men's 100 metres at the 2019 World Athletics Championships was held at the Khalifa International Stadium in Doha on 27 to 28 September 2019.

Summary
The semi-finals were dominated by world leader Christian Coleman, who was allowed to compete despite missing three doping tests in the year due to a technicality, and blasted a 9.88 while no other qualifiers broke 10.  The last time qualifier, Filippo Tortu, made the final by .001, running 10.101 over Tyquendo Tracey's 10.102, while Aaron Brown got in by placing second behind Coleman in heat 1 with 10.12.

In the final, defending champion Justin Gatlin got a good start to gain a step on the field, except Coleman got a better start, gaining that step on Gatlin.  Unlike 2017, Coleman did not give ground back, extending his lead to a dominating victory in 9.76.  A new personal best, world leading time for the season, that becomes the #6 time in history, just 0.02 seconds behind Gatlin's personal best. Returning to form, Andre De Grasse closed and nearly caught Gatlin at the line in 9.90, a new wind legal personal best.

At 37 years old, the world M35 record holder over 100m Justin Gatlin became the oldest athlete to ever medal in 100m in the World Championships history.

Records
Before the competition records were as follows:

The following records were set at the competition:

Qualification standard
The standard to qualify automatically for entry was 10.10.

Schedule
The event schedule, in local time (UTC+3), was as follows:

Results

Preliminary round
The first  athlete in each heat ( Q ) and the next five fastest ( q ) qualified for the first round proper. The overall results were as follows:
Wind: P1:+0.1, P2:+0.4, P3:+0.3, P4:+0.0

Heats
The first 3 in each heat ( Q ) and the next six fastest ( q ) qualified for the semifinals. The overall results were as follows:
Wind: H1:-0.3, H2:-0.8, H3:-0.8, H4:-0.3, H5:-0.3, H6:+0.1

Semi-finals

The first 2 in each heat ( Q ) and the next two fastest ( q ) qualified for the final.
Wind: S1:-0.3, S2:-0.3, S3:+0.8

Final
The final was started on 28 September at 22:15.
Wind: +0.6

References

100
100 metres at the World Athletics Championships